Salvatore Cascio (born 8 November 1979) is an Italian actor. His most famous performance was in Cinema Paradiso (1988), for which he received critical acclaim and a BAFTA Award. He suffers from retinitis pigmentosa. He is Roman Catholic.

Filmography

Notes

External links 

1979 births
Living people
People from Palazzo Adriano
Best Supporting Actor BAFTA Award winners
Italian male film actors
Italian male child actors
20th-century Italian male actors
21st-century Italian male actors
Actors from the Province of Palermo
Italian Roman Catholics